The twisted-toothed mouse (Quemisia gravis), also known as the twisted-toothed giant hutia is an extinct species of rodent in the family Heptaxodontidae. It is monotypic within the genus Quemisia. It was endemic to Hispaniola (today Haiti and the Dominican Republic).

References

Heptaxodontidae
Holocene extinctions
Mammals described in 1929
Fossil taxa described in 1929
Extinct animals of Haiti
Mammals of Hispaniola
Extinct animals of the Dominican Republic
Mammals of the Dominican Republic
Mammals of Haiti
Mammals of the Caribbean
Taxonomy articles created by Polbot
Taxobox binomials not recognized by IUCN